Women's football in Spain is not one of the traditional powers of women's football since the sport has a small following. Although football in the most popular sport in Spain, Men's football usually gets the biggest following. Currently there are two national competitions, the League and the Copa de la Reina (English: Queen's Cup), in the semi-professional club involved structure.

History

Women's football was recorded as being played as early as the 1910s. Between the 1930s and 1975, women were forbidden from playing football. The Royal Spanish Football Federation (RSFF) did not recognize women's football until 1980. Women did not have a national league until 1988. In 2019 the Spanish FA committed to spending $20 million in the area of women's football.

National competition
The first teams and the first informal women's football competitions in Spain emerged in the 1970s, although they were not  officially recognized by the Royal Spanish Football Federation until 1980, with the founding of the National Women's Football Committee. The first official national competition was the Copa de la Reina, established in 1983. The women's national league began to dispute the 1988-89 season.

Primera División is the national competition for female football players in Spain.

Below the Primera División, there is a second tier called Primera Federación, where its teams are divided into seven groups. In 2020 Primera Federación teams became full time professionals.

The lower tiers are administered by the regional federations.

National team

The Spain women's national football team has qualified three times to the FIFA Women's World Cup, and three times in the UEFA Women's Championship. The furthest the senior national team has reached at international competition is the semi finals at UEFA Women's Euro 1997. The women's national U-20 team were runner-ups at the 2018 U-20 World Cup. The U-19 national team won the UEFA Women's Under-19 Championship in 2004, 2017, and 2018. The national U-17 team also won the U-17 European Championship in 2010, 2011, 2015and 2018, as well as becoming the champion at the 2018 U-17 World Cup and finalists in the 2014 U-17 World Cup.

See also
 Football in Spain
 Spain women's national football team
 List of foreign Liga F players

References